Pannatal, also known as Garurtal, is one of the seven lakes of Sattal in Uttarakhand, India.

About
Sat Tal is located at an altitude of 1 370 m above sea level. Sat Tal is located 22 km from Nainital, 298 km from New Delhi, and 35 km from Kathgodam Railway Station. There are six other lakes in the surrounding area: Nal-Damyanti Tal, Purna Tal, Sita Tal, Ram Tal, Laxman Tal, and Sukha Tal (Khurdariya Tal).

The lake and its surroundings are clean and untouched by commercialization.

See also
 Nainital
 Bhimtal
 Kumaon

External links
 Official Website of Nainital
 Bhimtal

Lakes of Uttarakhand
Nainital district